Timothy "Speed" Levitch (born July 9, 1970) is an American actor, tour guide, poet, speaker, philosopher, author and voice actor.  The name "Speed" was given to him by a childhood friend in high school. Levitch has appeared in multiple films and has had his poetic and philosophical works published in books and periodicals.

Biography
Levitch was born July 9, 1970 in New York City. He mostly grew up in the Riverdale neighborhood of the Bronx, where he attended the Horace Mann School. When he was 12, his parents bought a house in Westchester County, New York, and he was briefly a suburbanite. He longed to return to New York City and eventually did.

In 1992 he received his tour guide license from the Central Park Conservancy. He later took a position with Apple and Gray Line Tours as a tour bus guide. He soon attracted a cultlike following, due not only to his fast talking style, but also for his obvious love of portraying his native city in psychedelic terms and with passionate philosophical ideas. Levitch's cult spread beyond New York when he became the subject of the 1998 documentary The Cruise. In 2000 he was a citizen of the art project Quiet, We Live in Sane.

In 2012 Levitch premiered a new documentary video series, Up to Speed, on its own Hulu channel. Directed by Richard Linklater, the series takes viewers on virtual tours of American cities, conversing with inanimate objects like San Francisco's gold fire hydrant and Chicago's original Haymarket Riot memorial.

Levitch is a member of The Ongoing Wow, a band in which he does spoken word over improvised music with Gals Panic and The Sinus Show member Jerm Pollet.

In 2007, Levitch moved to Kansas City and started a tour business called "Taste of KC."

Filmography
The Cruise (1998), as himself.
Anatomy of a Scene
Scotland, Pa. (2001), Hector. (Hippie #2)
Waking Life (2001) (voice), Lunatic, as himself (credited as Speed Levitch)
School of Rock (2003), Waiter.
Live from Shiva's Dance Floor (2003), as himself.
Video Capture Device (2004), as himself.
Stroker and Hoop (2004) TV Series (voice), Hoop. (credited as Speed Levitch)
Shooting Vegetarians (2005)
Xavier: Renegade Angel (2007) (voice), Puggler, the Punk Rock Juggler. (credited as Speed Levitch)
1 Giant Leap: What About Me? (2008), as himself. (credited as Speed Levitch)
We Live in Public (2009), as himself (A citizen of Quiet)
Up to Speed (2012), as himself.
High Maintenance (2019) TV Series, as himself. (credited as Timothy Speed Levitch; Season 3, Episode 9 "Cruise")

Bibliography

Notes

References
 War Correspondence from the Present Tense - an interview with Levitch
 Speed Levitch Explains It All
 Interview with Bennett Miller and Timothy "Speed" Levitch
 Present Magazine Feature
 City Snapshots

External links

 Official website
 

Jewish American male actors
American philosophers
1970 births
Living people
Horace Mann School alumni
People from the Bronx
Tour guides
21st-century American poets
21st-century American Jews